LNG Hrvatska d.o.o. (also LNG Croatia LLC) is a company that operates a floating liquefied natural gas (LNG) regasification terminal in Omišalj on the island of Krk, Croatia. It commenced operations on 1 January 2021, with full capacity (2.6 billion cubic metres annually) booked for the next three years.

History
The project was first considered in 1995 when initial exploratory work was undertaken. A feasibility study was completed by 2008 and the location permit was issued in 2010 after environmental impact assessment was carried out. The project was developed by Adria LNG, which shareholders were E.ON Ruhrgas, Total S.A., OMV, RWE, and Geoplin. The consortium slated a 25% stake for Croatian partners, expecting to include oil company INA (14%), power company HEP and gas pipeline operator Plinacro (together 11%).

In October 2009, one of the project partners RWE moved out from the project. 
In December 2010 the consortium closed its office in Croatia, which marked the end of the project.

In April 2016 First deputy prime minister Tomislav Karamarko announced the restart of the project.

On 30 November 2017 Front-End Engineering and Design, has been developed by Belgian company Tractebel. FEED is like a basic variant of floating construction LNG terminal on the island of Krk predicted the "most complex" scenario, which involves the FSRU ship of larger dimensions and the construction of the foundations of the concrete shore system reinforced concrete caissons.

The construction chronology:

 04/2019 - Site registration and start of construction work
 06/2019 - Start of construction work on jetty and the mooring dolphins
 08/2019 - Construction work on the gas pipeline and water supply system
 09/2019 - Start of dredging the terminal sea access path
 11/2019 - Delivery of pipes for gas pipeline to the construction site and start of  welding works
 01/2020 - Start of laying the gas pipeline and setting up the permanent air quality monitoring station
 03/2020 - Start of construction of the terminal firefighting water tank
 04/2020 - Installation of prestressed girder for jetty access bridge
 05/2020 - Start of construction of the terminal control building
 06/2020 - Delivery of high-pressure offloading arms to the construction site
 07/2020 - Installation of high-pressure offloading arms with mechanical completion of the pipeline and start of the tests
 09/2020 - Completion of land construction work
 10/2020 - Final works of arrangement of the terminal plateau
 11/2020 - Final works on the terminal
 12/2020 - Test run and issuance of the use permit for the terminal

The project was officially inaugurated in January 2021.

In April 2022, due to the outbreak of the crisis caused by the Russian invasion of Ukraine, a decision was made to increase the LNG gasification capacity to 338,000 m3/hour, which is about 2.9 billion cubic meters annually.

Due to the energy crisis, the Government of the Republic of Croatia made a strategic decision on August 18, 2022, to increase the capacity of the LNG terminal and gas pipeline Zlobin - Bosiljevo. The capacity of the terminal will be increased to 6.1 billion cubic meters, and the investment will cost a total of 180 million euros, of which 25 million relate to the terminal and 155 million to the gas pipeline.

Significance

The terminal has a geopolitical and strategic dimension in the context of strengthening the European energy market and increasing the security of gas supply to European Union countries and especially to Central and Southeast European countries that want to secure a new reliable gas supply route. It is a project of strategic importance for the European Union and the Republic of Croatia.

The terminal will provide additional source of natural gas for the Croatian market, which relies on natural gas for 48% of its energy needs. For this purpose, a new natural gas pipeline between Croatia and Hungary was built.

Technical features

The annual handling capacity of the vessel is 2.6 billion cubic meters. The terminal can accommodate all ship sizes from 3,500 to 265,000 cubic meters.

FSRU Vessel 
FSRU (Floating Storage & Regasification Unit) vessel consists of LNG storage tanks, equipment for LNG loading and unloading and LNG regasification equipment. All processes on board are monitored by the operator from the central control room while autonomous safety systems are in operation in case of fire and gas occurrence.

The FSRU vessel is equipped with four LNG storage tanks with a total capacity of 140,206 m3, three LNG regasification units with a maximum regasification rate of 451,840 m3/h and with power plant which generates electricity for the purpose of operating the terminal.

Regasification of LNG is performed by exchanging the heat of seawater and LNG over glycol as an intermediate fluid. Seawater transfers its heat to glycol and is afterwards discharged back to the sea without any treatment. The glycol afterwards transfers heat to the LNG which is regasified during this process. Natural gas is then  through high-pressure offloading arms, delivered to the gas transmission system of the Republic of Croatia.

Onshore part of the terminal 
The onshore part of the LNG terminal consists of the jetty head, breasting dolphins for FSRU berthing, mooring dolphins for FSRU and LNG carrier berthing, quick release hooks, the access bridge, the high-pressure offloading arms with connecting pipeline, pig launching station, firefighting system, terminal control building, and associated facilities.

The FSRU vessel is moored to the jetty and connected to the high-pressure offloading arms through which natural gas enters the connecting pipeline. In addition to the mooring of the FSRU, the jetty is also designed for the indirect acceptance of the LNG carrier, which is moored side by side to the FSRU vessel during transfer of the LNG.

Jetty head is the main part of the jetty, constructed as a platform on concrete piles. High pressure offloading arms with a connection to the connecting pipeline are located on the top part of the jetty head. The natural gas is transported through the connecting pipeline to the Omišalj gas node where the connecting pipeline is connected to transmission system of the Republic of Croatia.

Breasting dolphins for FSRU vessel berthing are constructed on concrete piles, equipped with fenders for safe berthing of the FSRU vessel.

The mooring dolphins for FSRU vessel and LNG carrier mooring are constructed on concrete piles, equipped with quick release hook mooring system to carry out unmooring of FSRU vessel in a safe and fast way in case of emergency.

The jetty head, breasting dolphins and mooring dolphins for FSRU and LNG carrier berthing are connected by catwalks. A 90 m long access bridge, with access pavement and sidewalk, connects the jetty head with onshore part of the jetty.

The connecting gas pipeline, with nominal diameter 1.000 mm and operating pressure of 100 bar is 4.2 km long. Starting point of the connecting pipeline is located at the jetty head and the end point is located on the Omišalj gas node. Main function of the connecting pipeline is send-out of the natural gas from terminal and its delivery to transmission system of the Republic of Croatia.

The connecting water supply line, with nominal diameter 90 mm and with a total length of 2.5 km is connected to the public water supply system at manhole near the state road D102. Main function of the water supply system is to provide water on the LNG facility for sanitary purposes, as well as for the filling of terminal firefighting water tank.

Port facility Omišalj-Njivice 
Special Purpose Port – Industrial Port LNG Terminal, Omišalj-Njivice is placed on the north part of the Krk island, 1.7 NM southeast of the Cape Tenka Punta.

 Port Facility: Omišalj – Njivice (LNG)
 IMO: HROMI-0003
 NBL number: HR807
 Port focus: LAT 45°12’02.7″N, LONG 14°31’58.6″E
 Port e-mail: port@lng.hr
 Port Authority: LNG Croatia LLC, Development and Port Security Department

Project company
The project is developed by LNG Hrvatska. The shareholders of the company are:
 Hrvatska elektroprivreda (HEP) d.d. 75%
 Plinacro d.o.o. 25%

Both of the shareholders are in 100% ownership of the Republic of Croatia.

The managing director of the company is Hrvoje Krhen, since 31 March 2020.

References

Oil and gas companies of Croatia
Liquefied natural gas terminals
Energy infrastructure in Croatia
Natural gas in Croatia